O Sétimo Guardião is a Brazilian telenovela produced and broadcast by TV Globo. It premiered on 12 November 2018, replacing Segundo Sol, and ended on 17 May 2019, being replaced by A Dona do Pedaço. It was created by Aguinaldo Silva and directed by Allan Fiterman.

Plot
In Serro Azul, a city in the interior of Minas Gerais, where the internet signal has not yet arrived, a source with rejuvenating and curative properties is protected by seven guardians—Mayor Eurico (Dan Stulbach), delegate Machado (Milhem Cortaz), the doctor Aranha (Paulo Rocha), the beggar Feliciano (Leopoldo Pacheco), the cafetina Ondina (Ana Beatriz Nogueira), the esoteric Milu (Zezé Polessa) and the guardian Egídio (Antônio Calloni)—take public notice and fall into the wrong hands. They also protect Léon the  cat (Eduardo Moscovis), a former guardian who was punished by the forces of nature to live in animal form for breaching one of the rules: not to constitute a family. When Egídio dies, he leaves in search of the new seventh guardian, because only then his charm will be finally broken. In São Paulo, Gabriel (Bruno Gagliasso) sees Léon through the streets and, mysteriously, feels that he must go to Serro Azul with the certainty that his destiny is there. He abandons the bride, Laura (Yanna Lavigne), at the altar, but on the escape ends up in a vehicular accident, subsequently being saved by the mystical powers of Luz (Marina Ruy Barbosa).

Everything changes with the arrival of Gabriel's mother, Valentina (Lilia Cabral), a great cosmetologist who was born in Serro Azul and left for the capital in search of power. With the help of unscrupulous driver Sampaio (Marcello Novaes), she returns only to discover the secrets of the source wealth. She will also be the great impediment of Luz and Gabriel's affair, since she was destined to flee from bankruptcy by marrying her son with Laura, daughter of the powerful Olavo (Tony Ramos), who was willing to merge the companies of the two families and now swears to destroy the shrew. In addition, the couple have to deal with Laura's revenge and the obsession of the arrogant ex-boyfriend of Luz, Enrico Júnior (José Loreto), and the envious Lourdes (Bruna Linzmeyer), who plays with the feelings of the naive Geandro (Caio Blat), but wants Gabriel. Also returning to the city is Neide (Viviane Araújo), Luz's mother who fled after she was born. She was indirectly responsible for Léon being turned into a cat, since he promised to take her pregnancy even against the rules of the guardians and, after punishing the source, left her believing that she was abandoned.

The city still keeps other stories, such as Mirtes (Elizabeth Savalla), a fervent blessed who lives supervising the lives of others, especially Nora Stella (Vanessa Giácomo), whom she always humbles for not giving her grandchildren, and of João Inácio (Paulo Vilhena), the ex-husband of her deceased daughter, who is in love with the gaga prostitute Stefânia (Carol Duarte). Maltoni (Matheus Abreu) is a handsome sexton who attracts girls to the church to admire him and lives a forbidden romance with Elisa (Giullia Buscacio), daughter of the conservative Jurandir (Paulo Miklos), who wants her to become a nun. Already Machado is a false macho man addicted to robbing panties of the neighbours to use in the bed with his wife Rita (Flávia Alessandra) in a fiery and comical relation, causing a great mystery in the city. Aphrodite (Carolina Dieckmann) lives in conflict with her husband, the cook Nicolau (Marcelo Serrado), for wanting to have a son, although they are already parents of four—three girls and a boy who hates sports. There is also the transgender Marcos Paulo (Nany People), who despite having become a woman, still demands to be called by the birth name.

Cast

 Bruno Gagliasso as Gabriel Marsalla
 Marina Ruy Barbosa as Luz da Lua Vidal
 Lília Cabral as Valentina Marsalla / Marlene Rocha
 Tony Ramos as Olavo Aragão Duarte  
 Eduardo Moscovis as Murilo Vidal / Leon
 Marcello Novaes as José Sampaio de Oliveira Gomes
 Isabela Garcia as Judith Alvares
 Dan Stulbach as Eurico Rocha
 Letícia Spiller as Marilda Rocha
 José Loreto as Eurico Rocha Júnior / Júnior
 Yanna Lavigne as Laura Aragão Duarte
 Caio Blat as Geandro Rocha
 Bruna Linzmeyer as Lourdes Maria Leme
 Elizabeth Savalla as Mirtes Aranha
 Nany People as Marcos Paulo Pianoviski Mattoso 
 Vanessa Giácomo as Stella Aranha
 Paulo Rocha as José Aranha
 Carolina Dieckmann as Afrodite Zerzil
 Marcelo Serrado as Nicolau Zerzil 
 Laryssa Ayres as Diana Zerzil
 Gabriel Stauffer as Walid Simões
 Giulia Gayoso as Rivalda Zerzil 
 Paulo Vilhena as João Inácio Dias
 Carol Duarte as Stefânia
 Caio Manhente as Guilherme Dias Aranha
 Cauê Campos as Arnaldo Alvares "Feijão"
 Fernanda de Freitas as Louise Marie Dechamps
 Theodoro Cochrane as Adamastor Davis Crawford 
 Marcos Caruso as Sóstenes Vidal
 Zezé Polessa as Milu Negromonte
 Paulo Miklos as Jurandir
 Ana Beatriz Nogueira as Ondina Aballo
 Leopoldo Pacheco as Feliciano Pataxó
 Milhem Cortaz as Joubert Machado
 Flávia Alessandra as Rita de Cássia Machado
 Aílton Graça as Padre Ramiro
 Heitor Martinez as Robério Alvares
 Matheus Abreu as Maltoni Ferraz
 Giullia Buscacio as Elisa Rangel
 Marcello Melo Jr. as Fabim
 Eduardo Speroni as Roberto "Bebeto" Zerzil
 Jaffar Bambirra as Leonardo Lounge Léo
 Inês Peixoto as Maria do Socorro Leme
 Guida Vianna as Firmina Assunção / Josefa da Cruz
 Viviane Araújo as Neide Assunção
 Roberto Birindelli as Tobias Lounge
 Adriana Lessa as Clotilde Lounge
 Lucci Ferreira as Patrício Nasser
 Josie Pessoa as Luciana
 Lyv Ziese as Katiucha
 Mila Carmo as Januária
 Simone Zucato as Beata Liliane
 Talita Fusco as Beata Roseane
 Felipe Hintze as Peçanha 
 Julia Konrad as Raimunda Leme
 Robson Santos as Alfredo
 Fábio Tokay as Jorge
 Liza Gomes as Lucilene
 Maureen Miranda as Dida
 Ana Paula Novellino as Jane
 Ana Clara Couto as Margareth Lounge
 Vittoria Seixas as Cristiana Zerzil

Soundtrack

Volume 1 

O Sétimo Guardião Vol. 1 is the first soundtrack of the telenovela, released on 25 January 2019 by Som Livre.

Volume 2 

O Sétimo Guardião Vol. 2 is the second soundtrack of the telenovela, released on 15 March 2019 by Som Livre.

Controversy 
The telenovela was accused of treating homosexuality as a punishment during the episode shown on the night of 22 January 2019, the character Eurico had to choose between two punishments for having betrayed the brotherhood: never to feel sexual attraction to women again, only to men, or to turn into a cat for life.

On 27 February 2019, Joseph Lima dos Santos, an extra, died during filming of the telenovela. According to employees involved in the production of the telenovela, the production crew removed his body from the set, and continued filming as if nothing had happened.

The telenovela was also accused of plagiarizing the book As Muralhas da Vida Eterna: Uma Metáfora Sobre o Tempo, by Barbara Rastelli, published in 2015. According to the author, she delivered the book to Globo to develop a telenovela based on this book, but the broadcaster refused the proposal. However, it was noted that some elements of the telenovela resembled her book.

Ratings

References

External links 
 

2018 telenovelas
2018 Brazilian television series debuts
2019 Brazilian television series endings
Brazilian telenovelas
Brazilian LGBT-related television shows
Portuguese-language telenovelas
TV Globo telenovelas
Television series about shapeshifting
Television series about cults